Barry Miles (born 21 February 1943) is an English author known for his participation in and writing on the subjects of the 1960s London underground and counterculture. He is the author of numerous books and his work has also regularly appeared in leftist newspapers such as The Guardian. In the 1960s, he was co-owner of the Indica Gallery and helped start the independent newspaper International Times.

Biography
In the 1960s, Miles worked at Better Books, which was managed by Tony Godwin. Godwin was friends with Lawrence Ferlinghetti, with whom he would exchange Penguin books for City Lights publications. In 1965 Allen Ginsberg gave a reading at Better Books that led to the International Poetry Incarnation, a seminal event co-organised by Miles.

In 1965, Miles and his wife, the former Susan Crane, introduced Paul McCartney to hash brownies by using a recipe for hash fudge that they had found in The Alice B. Toklas Cookbook.

Following the International Poetry Incarnation, Miles established the Indica Gallery and Bookshop, allowing him to meet many of the stars of the Swinging London social scene. Miles brought McCartney into contact with people who wanted to start International Times, which McCartney helped to fund.

With John Hopkins and Dave Howson, Miles organised The 14 Hour Technicolor Dream, a concert on 29 April 1967 at Alexandra Palace to raise funds for International Times. It was a multi-artist event, featuring poets, artists and musicians. Pink Floyd headlined the event; other artists included: Yoko Ono and John Lennon, Arthur Brown, jazz-rock group Soft Machine, Tomorrow and The Pretty Things.

Miles became the de facto manager of the Apple's short-lived Zapple Records label in 1969. While temporarily living in California, Miles produced an album of poetry readings by Richard Brautigan entitled Listening to Richard Brautigan for Zapple. Miles's friendship with Brautigan ended when Miles became involved in an affair with Brautigan's girlfriend Valerie Estes. By the time, the album was completed Miles and Brautigan communicated to each other only through their respective lawyers. Zapple was closed before it could release the Brautigan album, but it was eventually released in 1970 by the U.S. division of Harvest Records.

Miles also produced Ginsberg's Songs of Innocence and Experience LP, recorded in 1969 and released the following year. In 1970, Miles moved with his wife to rural New York state, where he lived with Ginsberg on his farm.  However, Miles's marriage soon ended and he returned to England. Miles currently lives in London and is married to travel writer Rosemary Bailey.

Miles's book Hippie is a reminiscence of the Hippie sub-culture of the 1960s and early 1970s, with interviews, quotes, and images. He co-wrote I Want to Take You Higher (documenting the Rock and Roll Hall of Fame and Museum exhibit by the same name) with Charles Perry and James Henke.

Miles wrote Paul McCartney's official biography, Many Years from Now (1998). Miles has also written biographies of Frank Zappa, John Lennon, William S. Burroughs, Jack Kerouac, Charles Bukowski and Ginsberg, in addition to books on The Beatles, Pink Floyd and The Clash, as well as a definitive history of London's counterculture since 1945, London Calling.

Politics
In March 1978, Miles wrote an article critical of the band Rush and its drummer Neil Peart, which contentiously labeled the band as right-wing; Peart described himself as a "left-libertarian." The article, published in UK's New Musical Express, took exception to Peart's advocacy of the Objectivist philosophy of Ayn Rand. Peart had also described the Sex Pistols as products of a "socialist" state. Miles also described Rand (a Russian anti-communist who had become an American citizen) as an "ultra right-wing American." Miles focused on Peart's politics and criticized the band's perceived aloofness and libertarian rhetoric.

In a 2005 biography of Frank Zappa, Miles criticized Zappa regarding his business-oriented approach to art and complaints about inefficient labor union regulations. Zappa regularly described himself as "a devout capitalist" and attempted to broker joint commercial ventures with business interests in the former Soviet Union following the end of the Cold War in 1991.

Works
 Miles and Pearce Marchbank, The Illustrated Rock Almanac (1977), Paddington Press
 Bob Dylan (1978), Big O Publishing
 Bob Dylan in His Own Words (1978), edited by Pearce Marchbank, Omnibus Press
 Beatles in Their Own Words (1978, compiler), edited by Pearce Marchbank, Omnibus Press
 Bowie in His Own Words (1980, compiler), Omnibus Press
 John Lennon in His Own Words  (1980, compiler), Omnibus Press
 David Bowie Black Book (1980), Omnibus Press
 
 Pink Floyd: A Visual Documentary (1981 revised edition, and 1988 as 21st anniversary edition), Omnibus Press
 The Beatles: An Illustrated Discography (1981), Omnibus Press
 The Jam (1981), Omnibus Press
 The Pretenders (1981), Omnibus Press
 The Ramones: An Illustrated Biography (1981), Omnibus Press
 Talking Heads (1981), Omnibus Press
 
 Pink Floyd: The Illustrated Discography (1981), Omnibus Press
 
 Mick Jagger in His Own Words (1982, compiler), Omnibus Press
 
 
 Pink Floyd: Another Brick: The Illustrated Pink Floyd Story (1984), Omnibus Press
 
 
 
 
 
 Frank Zappa in His Own Words (1993, compiler), Omnibus Press
 Frank Zappa: A Visual Documentary (1993), Omnibus Press
 The Rolling Stones: A Visual Documentary (1994), Omnibus Press

Notes and references

External links
Barry Miles' website
Finding aid to the Barry Miles papers at Columbia University Rare Book & Manuscript Library
The Papers of Barry Miles at the British Library

Apple Records
Celebrity biographers
English biographers
People from Cirencester
1943 births
Living people
British psychedelic drug advocates
Date of birth missing (living people)